Andisa Ntsila (born 7 November 1993) is a South African professional rugby union player for the  in the Currie Cup. His regular position is flanker or number eight.

Rugby career

Youth rugby

Ntsila was born in Queenstown, where he attended Queen's College until 2011. He was included in their Under-19 squad that participated in Group A of the 2012 Under-19 Provincial Championship.

A much better season followed in 2014, as the team won five of their seven matches during the regular season to finish in third position on the log. He also started their semi-final match against , scoring his third try of the competition in a 40–33 victory, and the final against , where his team was outclassed by the unbeaten  team who won the match 46–3.

NMMU Madibaz / SWD Eagles

He scored one try in their match against  in a disappointing season for a NMMU side that finished second-last on the log.

Soon after the 2015 Varsity Cup finished, Ntsila was also included in the  squad for the 2015 Vodacom Cup.

Ntsila was also included in the SWD Eagles squad for their 2015 Currie Cup qualification campaign. They lost their first match, but then recovered to win four matches in a row to finish in second position to qualify for the semi-finals, with Ntsila starting the final two of those matches. Ntsila again played off the bench in the final, but could not prevent the hosts winning the match 44–20 to win the title for the first time.

Ntsila made three starts and two substitute appearances for the NMMU Madibaz in the 2016 Varsity Cup, repeating the team's 2015 performance by finishing the season in second-last position. He again linked up with the SWD Eagles after the Varsity Cup for their 2016 Currie Cup qualification competition. He appeared in their first eleven matches of the competition – scoring one try in a 96–5 victory over Namibian side  – before his short spell with the  Super Rugby side.

Southern Kings

References

South African rugby union players
Living people
1993 births
People from Queenstown, South Africa
Rugby union flankers
Rugby union number eights
Southern Kings players
SWD Eagles players
Sharks (Currie Cup) players
Sharks (rugby union) players
Cheetahs (rugby union) players
Free State Cheetahs players
Rugby union players from the Eastern Cape
Alumni of Queen's College Boys' High School